"Samsara 2015" is a 2014 song by the Norwegian and Swedish dance music producer duo Tungevaag & Raaban. It became a hit in Scandinavian charts including Norway, Sweden and Denmark. The Norwegian hit version featured the vocals of Norwegian singer Emila that was released again charting in its own right again in VG-lista, the Norwegian Singles Chart and in Finland.

Awards and nominations
The song was nominated for "Best Hit" category during 2014 Spellemannprisen in Norway but lost to "Engel" by Admiral P featuring Nico D.

Charts

Weekly charts

Year-end charts

Certifications

References

2014 songs
2014 singles
Martin Tungevaag songs
Number-one singles in Finland